Banwaria is a village in West Champaran district in the Indian state of Bihar.

Demographics
 India census, Banwaria had a population of 2230 in 398 households. Males constitute 52.87% of the population and females 47.13%. Banwaria has an average literacy rate of 42.82%, lower than the national average of 74%: male literacy is 63.76%, and female literacy is 36.23%. In Banwaria, 19.46% of the population is under 6 years of age.

References

Villages in West Champaran district